Many histories may refer to:
 The many worlds interpretation of quantum theory 
 The consistent histories interpretation of quantum theory 
 The sum over histories or path integral formulation of quantum theory